Lyons Maritime Museum is a diving history museum in St. Augustine, Florida, St. Johns County, Florida. The museum exhibits include diving equipment such as diving helmets, diving knives, lamps, flashlights, diving boots, sandals, and chest weights. It opened in 1990. The museum was created by Leon Lyons, author of Helmets of the Deep.

See also
List of museums in Florida

References

Links
Lyons Maritime Museum website
Biography

 

Museums in St. Augustine, Florida
Maritime museums in Florida
History of underwater diving